Sean Ryan (born 21 January 1941) is a British racing cyclist. He rode in the 1961 Tour de France.

References

1941 births
Living people
British male cyclists
Place of birth missing (living people)